Ihar Boki (born 28 June 1994) is a visually impaired Belarusian Paralympic swimmer. He competed at the 2012, 2016 and 2020 Paralympics and won 16 gold medals. , he holds the S13 long course world records in 100, 200 and 400 metre freestyle, 50 and 100 metre backstroke and 200 metres individual medley events. In 2018, he was named the World Disabled Male Swimmer of the Year by Swimming World.

References

External links

 

1994 births
Living people
Belarusian male freestyle swimmers
World record holders in paralympic swimming
S13-classified Paralympic swimmers
Paralympic gold medalists for Belarus
Paralympic silver medalists for Belarus
Swimmers at the 2012 Summer Paralympics
Swimmers at the 2016 Summer Paralympics
Swimmers at the 2020 Summer Paralympics
Medalists at the 2012 Summer Paralympics
Medalists at the 2016 Summer Paralympics
Medalists at the 2020 Summer Paralympics
Medalists at the World Para Swimming Championships
Medalists at the World Para Swimming European Championships
Paralympic medalists in swimming
Paralympic swimmers of Belarus
People from Babruysk
Sportspeople from Mogilev Region